Visa requirements for Bolivian citizens are administrative entry restrictions by the authorities of other states placed on citizens of Bolivia. As of December 2021, Bolivian citizens had visa-free or visa on arrival access to 79 countries and territories, ranking the Bolivian passport 72nd in terms of travel freedom according to the Henley Passport Index.

Bolivian citizens may use their ID card rather than their passport when travelling to Argentina, Brazil, Chile, Colombia, Ecuador, Paraguay, Peru, Uruguay and Venezuela.

Visa requirements map

Visa requirements
Visa requirements for holders of normal passports travelling for tourist purposes:

Bolivia is an associated member of Mercosur. As such, its citizens enjoy unlimited access to any of the full members (Argentina, Brazil, Paraguay and Uruguay) and other associated members (Chile, Peru, Colombia and Ecuador) with the right to residence and work, with no requirement other than nationality. Citizens of these nine countries (including Bolivia) may apply for the grant of "temporary residence" for up to two years in another country of the bloc. Then, they may apply for "permanent residence" just before the term of their "temporary residence" expires.

Unrecognized or partially recognized countries

Dependent and autonomous territories

Non-visa restrictions

See also

 Visa policy of Bolivia
 Bolivian passport

References and Notes
References

Notes

Bolivia
Foreign relations of Bolivia